The neuroscience of aging is the study of the changes in the nervous system that occur with ageing.  Aging is associated with many changes in the central nervous system, such as mild atrophy of the cortex that is considered non-pathological.  Aging is also associated with many neurological and neurodegenerative disease such as amyotrophic lateral sclerosis, dementia, mild cognitive impairment, Parkinson's disease, and Creutzfeldt–Jakob disease.

Normal structural and neural changes
Neurogenesis occurs very little in adults, only occurring in the hypothalamus and striatum to a small extent in a process called adult neurogenesis.  The volume of the brain actually decrease roughly 5% per decade after forty.  It is currently unclear why brain volume decreases with age, however, a few causes may include: cell death, decreased cell volume, and changes in synaptic structure.  The changes in brain volume is heterogenous across regions with prefrontal cortex receiving the most significant reduction in volume followed in order by the striatum, the temporal lobe, cerebellar vermis, cerebellar hemispheres, and the hippocampus.  However, one review found that the amygdala and ventromedial prefrontal cortex remained relatively free of atrophy, which is consistent with the finding of emotional stability occurring with non-pathological aging.  Enlargement of the ventricles, sulci and fissures are also common in non-pathological aging.

Changes may also be associated with neuroplasticity, synaptic functionality and voltage gated calcium channels.  Increased magnitude of hyperpolarization, possibly a result of dysfunctional calcium regulation, leads to decreased firing rate of neurons and decreased plasticity.  This effect is particularly pronounced in the hippocampus of aged animals, and may be an important contributor to age-associated memory deficits. The hyperpolarization of a neuron can be divided into three stages: the fast, medium and slow hyperpolarization.  In aged neurons, the medium and slow hyperpolarization phases involve the prolonged opening of calcium-dependent potassium channels. The prolonging of this phase has been hypothesized to be a result of deregulated calcium and hypoactivity of cholinergic, dopaminergic, serotonergic and glutaminergic pathways.

Normal functional changes
Episodic memory starts to decline gradually from middle age, while semantic memory increases all the way into early old age and declines thereafter.  Older adults tend to engage their prefrontal cortex more often during working memory tasks, possibly to compensate with executive functions.  Further impairments of cognitive function associated with aging include decrease in processing speed and inability to focus.  A model proposed to account for altered activation posits that decreased neural efficiency driven by amyloid plaques and decreased dopamine functionality lead to compensatory activation.  Decreased processing of negative stimuli as opposed to positive stimuli appear in aging, become significant enough to detect even with autonomic nervous responses to emotionally charged stimuli.  Aging is also associated with decreased plantar reflex and achilles reflex response.  Nerve conductance also decreases during normal aging.

DNA damage

Certain genes of the human frontal cortex display reduced transcriptional expression after age 40, and especially after age 70.  In particular, genes that have central roles in synaptic plasticity display reduced expression with age.  The promoters of genes with reduced expression in the cortex of older individuals have a marked increase in DNA damage, likely oxidative DNA damage.

Pathological changes

Roughly 20% of persons greater than 60 years of age have a neurological disorder, with episodic disorders being the most common followed by extrapyramidal movement disorders, and nerve disorders.  Diseases commonly associated with old age include

Multiple system atrophy
Parkinson's disease
Alzheimer's disease
Stroke.
Amyotrophic lateral sclerosis
Creutzfeldt–Jakob disease
Frontotemporal Dementia
Dementia with Lewy bodies
Corticobasal Degeneration
Transient ischemic attack
Vascular dementia

The misfolding of proteins is a common component of the proposed pathophysiology of many diseases associated with aging, however there is insufficient evidence to prove this.  For example, the tau hypothesis to Alzheimer's proposes that tau protein accumulation results in the breakdown neuron cytoskeletons leading to Alzheimer's. Another proposed mechanism for Alzheimer's is related to the accumulation of amyloid beta,. in a similar mechanism to the prion propagation of Creutzfeldt-Jakob disease.  Similarly the protein alpha-synuclein is hypothesized to accumulate in Parkinson's and related diseases.

Chemo brain
Treatments with anticancer chemotherapeutic agents often are toxic to the cells of the brain, leading to memory loss and cognitive dysfunction that can persist long after the period of exposure.  This condition, termed chemo brain, appears to be due to DNA damages that cause epigenetic changes in the brain that accelerate the brain aging process.

Management
Treatment of an age related neurological disease varies from disease to disease.  Modifiable risk factors for dementia include diabetes, hypertension, smoking, hyperhomocysteinemia, hypercholesterolemia, and obesity (which is usually associated with many other risk factors for dementia).  Paradoxically, smoking confers protection against Parkinson's disease.  Also conferring protective benefits to age related neurological disease in consumption of coffee or caffeine.  Consumption of fruits, fish and vegetables confer protection against dementia, as does a Mediterranean diet. Physical exercise significantly lowers the risk of cognitive decline in old age, and is an effective treatment for those with dementia and Parkinson's disease.

References

Developmental neuroscience
Geriatrics
Gerontology